Ralph David Ruthstrom (July 12, 1921 – March 1962) was an American football running back and defensive back in the National Football League for the Washington Redskins and the Cleveland / Los Angeles Rams.  Ruthstrom also played in the All-America Football Conference for the Baltimore Colts.  He attended Sam Houston State University and Southern Methodist University.

External links 
 

1921 births
1962 deaths
Sportspeople from Schenectady, New York
Players of American football from New York (state)
American football running backs
American football defensive backs
Sam Houston Bearkats football players
SMU Mustangs football players
Cleveland Rams players
Los Angeles Rams players
Washington Redskins players
Baltimore Colts (1947–1950) players